Judge Molloy may refer to:

Donald W. Molloy (born 1946), judge of the United States District Court for the District of Montana
Kenneth Molloy (1919–1999), judge on the New York State Supreme Court
Robert A. Molloy (born 1975), judge of the District Court of the Virgin Islands and of the United States Virgin Islands Superior Court